Acraea bomba, the Bomba acraea, is a butterfly in the family Nymphalidae. It is found in Kenya, Tanzania, Malawi, Zambia and on the eastern highlands of Zimbabwe.

Description
Very similar to Acraea anacreon qv. for diagnosis

Biology
The habitat consists of grassland and open woodland.

Adults are on wing year round.

The larvae feed on Alchemilla gracilipes, Aeschynomene, Adenia and Wormskioldia species.

Taxonomy
It is a member of the Acraea rahira species group - but see also Pierre & Bernaud, 2014

References

Butterflies described in 1889
bomba
Butterflies of Africa
Taxa named by Henley Grose-Smith